Harrison Lake is located in Glacier National Park, in the U. S. state of Montana. Near the eastern end of the lake is the Harrison Lake Patrol Cabin, which is listed on the National Register of Historic Places.

See also
List of lakes in Flathead County, Montana (A-L)

References

Lakes of Glacier National Park (U.S.)
Lakes of Flathead County, Montana